Afro-American Insurance Company Building is a historic commercial building located at Rock Hill, South Carolina.  It was built about 1909, and is a two-story, brick commercial building. The façade has a tan brick veneer, while the sides and rear are in red brick. It is an important surviving example of a commercial building related to the African-American community of the early-20th century.

It was listed on the National Register of Historic Places in 1992.

References

African-American history of South Carolina
Commercial buildings on the National Register of Historic Places in South Carolina
Commercial buildings completed in 1909
Buildings and structures in Rock Hill, South Carolina
National Register of Historic Places in Rock Hill, South Carolina